Neocollyris samosirensis is a species of ground beetle in the genus Neocollyris in the subfamily Carabinae. It was described by Naviaux in 1994.

References

Samosirensis, Neocollyris
Beetles described in 1994